Eupithecia guayacanae is a moth in the family Geometridae. It is found the Region of Santiago (Santiago Province) in Chile. The habitat consists of the Central Valley Biotic Province.

The length of the forewings is about 10 mm for males. The fore- and hindwings are unicolorous milky white.

References

Moths described in 1991
guayacanae
Moths of South America
Endemic fauna of Chile